Timber is the term common in the United Kingdom and Australia for unprocessed wood. Lumber is common in the United States and Canada.

Timber, The Timber or Timbers may also refer to:

Films
 Timber (1941 film), a Walt Disney animated short
 Timber (1942 film), a feature-length film
 The Timber, a 2015 American Western

People
 Dylan Timber (born 2000), Dutch footballer
 Jurriën Timber (born 2001), Dutch footballer
 Quinten Timber (born 2001), Dutch footballer
 Alex Timbers (born 1978), American writer and director
 Chauncey Yellow Robe (c. 1869–1930), Native American educator, lecturer, actor and activist nicknamed "Timber" in his youth
 Henry Wood (1869–1944), British orchestral conductor nicknamed "Timber"

Places

United States
 Timber, Missouri, an unincorporated community
 Timber, Oregon, an unincorporated community
 Timber Mountain (San Bernardino County, California)
 Timber Ridge, Virginia and West Virginia
 Timber Hill, Missouri
 Timber Lake, near the city of Timber Lake, South Dakota
 Timber Creek (South Dakota)
 Timber Run, a river in New Jersey

Elsewhere
 Timber Peak, Victoria Land, Antarctica
 Timber Creek (Bahamas)
 Timber Island, Lake Ontario, Canada

Songs
 "Timber" (Coldcut and Hexstatic song), 1998
 "Timber" (Pitbull song), a 2013 song by Pitbull featuring Kesha
 "Timber", a 1956 comedy single by Marty Brill
 "Timber", a 1978 single by Tavares
 "Timber!" (Bee Gees song), a 1965 song by the Bee Gees
 "Timber, I'm Falling in Love", written by Kostas and performed by Patty Loveless

Other uses
 Portland Timbers (disambiguation), various professional soccer teams
 Timber School, the first school in Newbury Park, California
 Timber (video game), a 1984 arcade game by Bally Midway
 Timber, the pet wolf of the G.I. Joe character Snake Eyes
 the title character of Timber the Treasure Dog, a 2016 film
 Timber: Or Discoveries Made Upon Men And Matter, observations collected by playwright Ben Jonson (1640 posth.)

See also
 Timbre, the quality of a musical note or sound or tone
 Timber Timbre, a Canadian folk rock band

Lists of people by nickname